Neoguraleus morgani is an extinct species of sea snail, a marine gastropod mollusk in the family Mangeliidae.

Description

Distribution
This extinct marine species is endemic to New Zealand.

References

 Marwick, J. "An examination of some of the Tertiary Mollusca claimed to be common to Australia and New Zealand." Report of the Australian Association for the Advancement of Science 16 (1924): 316-331.
 Maxwell, P.A. (2009). Cenozoic Mollusca. pp 232–254 in Gordon, D.P. (ed.) New Zealand inventory of biodiversity. Volume one. Kingdom Animalia: Radiata, Lophotrochozoa, Deuterostomia. Canterbury University Press, Christchurch.

morgani
Gastropods described in 1924
Gastropods of New Zealand